Wally or Wallie is a given name, and a nickname for Wallace which ultimately means 'Wales' and Walter. It may refer to:

People 
 Wally Bayola (born 1972), Filipino actor and comedian
 Wallie Branston, Canadian pioneering race car driver in the 1940s and '50s
 Wallace Smith Broecker (born 1931), American geochemist
 Wally Bruner (1931–1997), American journalist and game show host
 Wally Butts (1905–1973), American football coach
 Wally Chambers (born 1951), American football player
 Wallie Coetsee (born 1972), South African golfer
 Wally Cox (1924–1973), American comedian and actor
 W. A. Criswell (1909–2002), American pastor, author, and former president of the Southern Baptist Convention
 Wally Dallenbach Jr. (born 1963), American race car driver
 Wally Dallenbach Sr. (born 1936), American race car driver
 Wally Downes (born 1961), English association footballer and coach
 Wally Fawkes (1924–2023), British-Canadian jazz clarinettist and satirical cartoonist
 Wally Feresten, American cue card handler
 Wally Funk (born 1939), American aviator, oldest person to travel into space
 Wally Garard (1916–2004), American football player
 Wally George (1931–2003), American commentator born George Walter Pearch
 Wally Gould (1938–2018), English footballer
 Wally Green (born 1918), English motorcycle speedway rider
 Wally Hayward (1908–2006), South African ultra distance runner
 Wallie Herzer (1885–1961), American composer of popular music, music publisher, and pianist
 Wallie Abraham Hurwitz (1886–1958), American mathematician
 Wally Kurth (born 1958), American soap opera actor
 Wallie or Willie Lane (1883–1920), British jockey
 Wally Lewis (born 1959) Australian rugby league footballer
 Wally Moon (born 1930) American baseball player
 Wally Nanayakkara (1939-2003), Sri Lankan Sinhala cinema, TV, and theater actor
 Wally Nightingale, (born 1956), British guitarist and founder of the Sex Pistols
 Wally Parks (1913–2007), one of the founders of the National Hot Rod Association
 Wally Phillips (1925–2008), American radio personality
 Wally Price (born 1925), Australian rules footballer
 Wally Prigg (1908–1980), Australian rugby league footballer
 Wally Schirra (1923–2007), American astronaut
 Wally Szczerbiak (born 1977), retired National Basketball Association player
 Wally Wingert (born 1961), American voice actor
 Wally Wolf (1930–1997), American swimmer, water polo player, and Olympic champion
 Wally Wolf (baseball) (1942–2020), American baseball player

Fictional characters
 Wally Walrus, character from Woody Woodpecker
 Wally Gator, an anthropomorphic alligator from The Hanna-Barbera New Cartoon Series
 Wally the Green Monster, the official mascot of the Boston Red Sox baseball team
 Wally (Dilbert), a lazy engineer from the Dilbert comic strip
 Wally (Pokémon), a character from the Pokémon video game series
 Wally (Wallabies mascot)
 Wally Cleaver, the older brother played by Tony Dow on the television series Leave it to Beaver
 Wally West, third character to become the Flash in the DC Comics Universe
 Character in the Where's Wally? series of books (known as Waldo in the United States)
 The mascot of "Wally World" in National Lampoon's Vacation
 Wallace "Wally" Fitzgerald McGillicutty, the polar bear from the webcomic Wally and Osborne, formerly known as On the Rocks
 Wallabee "Wally" Beatles, a fictional character from Codename: Kids Next Door
 Wally the Walrus, a recurring character from the Canadian television series PAW Patrol
 Wally Warbles, a bird boss in the video game Cuphead
 Wally the Great, a magician in The Wiggles Movie
 WALL-E, a fictional robot tasked to clean up the Earth in the 2008 animated film, "WALL-E"
 Wally B., a character in the 1984 short film The Adventures of André & Wally B.
 Wally B. Feed, cartographer from the Monkey Island game series
 Wally the Wizard, a Magician child from Marvel Comics.
 Wally/Wolliriki, a character in Kikoriki, also known as GoGoRiki (United States).
 Title character of opera La Wally (female; short for Walburga)

See also
 Wali (given name)

English masculine given names
English-language masculine given names
Hypocorisms